Hibbertia demissa is a species of flowering plant in the family Dilleniaceae and is endemic to a restricted area of New South Wales. It is a low-lying shrublet with small elliptic leaves and single yellow flowers arranged on the ends of branchlets, with nine to twelve stamens arranged around three carpels.

Description
There are nine to twelve stamens arranged around the three hairy carpels, each carpel with four ovules. Flowering has been observed in October.

Taxonomy
Hibbertia demissa was first formally described in 2013 by Hellmut R. Toelken in the Journal of the Adelaide Botanic Gardens from specimens collected "near the top of the range near Backwater" in 1929. The specific epithet (demissa) means "low and humble", referring to the habit of this species.

Distribution and habitat
This hibbertia grows in sandy soil over granite in forest on the Northern Tablelands of New South Wales.

See also
List of Hibbertia species

References

demissa
Flora of New South Wales
Plants described in 2013
Taxa named by Hellmut R. Toelken